Olmstead may refer to:

People
 Aaron Olmsted (1753–1806), sometime historically misspelled as Aaron Olmstead, New England sea captain
 Albert T. Olmstead (1880–1945) American assyriologist
 Bert Olmstead (1926–2015), Canadian ice hockey player
 Charles H. Olmstead (1837–1926), Confederate colonel
 Charles Sanford Olmsted (1853–1918), Episcopal bishop of Colorado
 Charles Tyler Olmstead (1842–1824), Episcopal bishop of Central New York 
 David Olmstead, Canadian politician
 Denison Olmstead (1791–1859), American astronomer
 Gertrude Olmstead (1897–1975), American actress 
 Marla Olmstead  (born 2000, American abstract artist
 Matt Olmstead, American writer and producer for television shows
 C. Michelle Olmstead (born 1969), American astronomer
 Roy Olmstead (1886–1966), famous bootlegger during American prohibition
 Robert Olmstead (born 1954), American novelist and educator
 Stephen G. Olmstead (born 1929), American Army officer

Case law
Olmstead v. United States, a 1928 decision of the United States Supreme Court concerning the legality of wiretapping by government officials
Olmstead v. L.C., a 1999 decision of the United States Supreme Court defining the right of people with mental disabilities to live in the community rather than institutions

Other
Lake Olmstead Stadium, stadium in Augusta, Georgia used primarily by the Augusta GreenJackets baseball team

See also
 Olmsted (disambiguation)
 Olmsted (name)